Syntypistis is a genus of moths of the family Notodontidae first described by Turner in 1907.

Species
Syntypistis alboviridis (Kiriakoff, 1970)
Syntypistis alleni (Holloway, 1983)
Syntypistis ardjuna (Kiriakoff, 1967)
Syntypistis amamiensis Nakatomi, 1981
Syntypistis ambigua Schintlmeister & Fang, 2001
Syntypistis aspera Kishida & Kobayashi, 2004
Syntypistis ceramensis (Kiriakoff, 1967)
Syntypistis chambae (Kiriakoff, 1970)
Syntypistis charistera (West, 1932)
Syntypistis chloropasta Turner, 1907
Syntypistis comatus (Leech, 1898)
Syntypistis cupreonitens (Kiriakoff, 1963)
Syntypistis cyanea (Leech, 1888)
Syntypistis defector (Schintlmeister, 1997)
Syntypistis eichhorni (Kiriakoff, 1970)
Syntypistis fasciata (Moore, 1879)
Syntypistis ferrea (Kiriakoff, 1967)
Syntypistis grisescens (Roepke, 1944)
Syntypistis hasegawai (Nakamura, 1976)
Syntypistis hercules (Schintlmeister, 1997)
Syntypistis japonica Nakatomi, 1981
Syntypistis jupiter (Schintlmeister, 1997)
Syntypistis lineata (Okano, 1960)
Syntypistis malayana (Nakamura, 1976)
Syntypistis melana C.S. Wu & C.L. Fang, 2003
Syntypistis murina (Kiriakoff, 1967)
Syntypistis nigribasalis (Wileman, 1910)
Syntypistis opaca Turner, 1922
Syntypistis palladina (Schaus, 1928)
Syntypistis pallidifascia (Hampson, 1892)
Syntypistis paranga (Kiriakoff, 1970)
Syntypistis parcevirens (de Joannis, 1929)
Syntypistis perdix (Moore, 1879)
Syntypistis praeclara M. Wang & Kobayashi, 2004
Syntypistis pryeri (Leech, 1889)
Syntypistis punctatella (Motschulsky, 1860)
Syntypistis rhypara (Kiriakoff, 1970)
Syntypistis scensus (Schintlemeister, 1997)
Syntypistis sinope Schintlmeister, 2002
Syntypistis spadix Kishida & Kobayashi, 2004
Syntypistis spitzeri (Schintlmeister, 1987)
Syntypistis subgeneris (Strand, 1916)
Syntypistis subgriseoviridis (Kiriakoff, 1963)
Syntypistis synechochlora (Kiriakoff, 1963)
Syntypistis triguttata (Kiriakoff, 1967)
Syntypistis trioculata (Holloway, 1976)
Syntypistis umbrosa (Matsumura, 1927)
Syntypistis uskwara (Kiriakoff, 1970)
Syntypistis victor Schintlmeister & Fang, 2001
Syntypistis viridigriseus (Rothschild, 1917)
Syntypistis viridipicta (Wileman, 1910)
Syntypistis witoldi (Schintlmeister, 1997)

References

Notodontidae